Cook County Board of Commissioners 14th district is a electoral district for the Cook County Board of Commissioners.

The district was established in 1994, when the board transitioned from holding elections in individual districts, as opposed to the previous practice of holding a set of two at-large elections (one for ten seats from the city of Chicago and another for seven seats from suburban Cook County).

Geography

1994 boundaries
When the district was first established, it covered parts of the north and northwest suburbs of Cook County.

2001 redistricting
New boundaries were adopted in August 2001, with redistricting taking place following the 2000 United States Census.

In regards to townships, the district's redistricted boundaries included parts of Barrington, Niles, Northfield, Palatine, and Wheeling townships. The district contained the entirety of both the Barrington and Palatine townships

2012 redistricting
The district, as redistricted in 2012 following the 2010 United States Census, included parts of Arlington Heights, Barrington, Buffalo Grove, Deerfield, Deer Park, Glencoe, Glenview, Golf, Hoffman Estates, Iverness, Mount Prospect, Northfield, Northbrook, Palatine, Prospect Heights, Rolling Meadows, Schaumburg, Wheeling, and Wilmette.

In regards to townships, the district's boundaries included parts of Niles, Northfield, Palatine, and Wheeling townships. It is located in northern Cook County.

The district was 90.32 square miles (57,806.14 acres).

Politics
From 1994 until 2018, the district was represented by Republicans. The district was considered to be a Republican stronghold during this time. In the 2016 United States presidential election, the Democratic ticket of Hillary Clinton and Tim Kaine won a strong victory in the district over the Republican ticket of Donald Trump and Mike Pence. The commissioner of the district flipped to the Democratic Party in 2018, a year which saw an overall strong performance by the Democratic Party in that year's elections in Illinois and an unprecedentedly strong and well-funded effort by the Cook County Democratic Party to target the district.

List of commissioners representing the district

Election results

|-
| colspan=16 style="text-align:center;" |Cook County Board of Commissioners 14th district general elections
|-
!Year
!Winning candidate
!Party
!Vote (pct)
!Opponent
!Party
! Vote (pct)
|-
|1994
| |Richard Siebel
| | Republican
| | 49,280 (66.08%)
| | Kelly Ann Sheehan
| | Democratic
| | 25,302 (33.93%)
|-
|1998
| |Gregg Goslin
| | Republican
| | 45,781 (59.27%)
| | Joyce Thompson Fitzgerald
| | Democratic
| | 31,458 (40.73%)
|-
|2002
| |Gregg Goslin
| | Republican
| |51,691 (61.15%)
| | Allan M. Monat
| | Democratic
| | 32,836 (38.85%)
|-
|2006
| |Gregg Goslin
| | Republican
| |49,400 (53.80%)
| | Michelene "Mickie" Polk
| | Democratic
| | 42,426 (46.20%)
|-
|2010
| |Gregg Goslin
| | Republican
| |60,664 (61.89%)
| | Jennifer Bishop Jenkins
| | Democratic
| | 37,357 (38.11%)
|-
|2014
| |Gregg Goslin
| | Republican
| |66,217 (100%)
|
|
|
|-
|2018
| |Scott R. Britton
| | Democratic
| |62,792 (54.19%)
| | Gregg Goslin
| | Republican
| | 53,079 (45.81%)  
|-
|2022
| |Scott R. Britton
| | Democratic
| |67,575 (61.28%)
| | Benton Howser
| | Republican
| | 42,703 (38.72%)

References

Cook County Board of Commissioners districts
Constituencies established in 1994
1994 establishments in Illinois